The UEFA Women's Cup 2006–07 was the sixth edition of the UEFA Women's Cup football club tournament (since rebranded as the UEFA Women's Champions League). 43 teams from 42 football associations took part, starting with the first qualifying round played on 8 and 18 August 2006. The tournament ended with Arsenal L.F.C. of England emerging out as the winners in the final after a 1–0 aggregate win over Umeå IK of Sweden; this was the first time a British club had claimed the trophy.

First qualifying round

Group A1

Group A2

Group A3

Group A4

Group A5

Group A6

Group A7

Group A8

Group A9

Second qualifying round

Group B1

Group B2

Group B3

Group B4

Quarter-finals
The first legs were played on October 11 and 12 2006, with the second legs on October 18 and 19.

First Leg

Second Leg

Semi-finals
The first legs were played on November 4, 2006, with the second legs on November 11 and 12.

First Leg

Second Leg

Final

The first leg was played on April 21, 2007, and the second leg was played on April 29, 2007.

First Leg

Second Leg

Top goalscorers 
(excluding qualifying rounds)

References

External links
 2006–07 season at UEFA website
 UEFA Women's Cup results at RSSSF

Women's Cup
2006-07
UEFA
UEFA